Mulberry Grove was a historic plantation house located near Ahoskie, Hertford County, North Carolina.  It was built about 1758, and was originally a -story brick dwelling with Georgian detailing, which was raised to two stories.  At that time, it was extensively remodeled in the Greek Revival style with a hipped roof. It has a frame wing to form a "T"-shape. It was the ancestral seat of the Cotton and Moore families of Hertford County.  The house has been demolished.

It was listed on the National Register of Historic Places in 1980.

References

Plantation houses in North Carolina
Houses on the National Register of Historic Places in North Carolina
Georgian architecture in North Carolina
Greek Revival houses in North Carolina
Houses completed in 1758
Houses in Hertford County, North Carolina
National Register of Historic Places in Hertford County, North Carolina